The Chaltén Mountain Range Natural Site is a natural site part of the Bernardo O'Higgins National Park in the Magallanes and Chilean Antarctica Region, Chile. It is located between the boundary demarcated by the 1994 arbitration award and section B of the 1998 agreement between Argentina and Chile. It has an area of 768 hectares (1,898 acres).

It is located in between Mount Fitz Roy and the Torre/Adela Mountain Range covering the northern part of the basin of the Torre Glacier.

Within the natural site, the Fitz Roy (3,406 meters above sea level), Pollone, Piergiorgio mountains, as well as, the Standhardt, Desmochada, Silla needle, point Anna, point Mujer as well as the Italian pass and part of the Fitz Roy North glacier stand out in the Chaltén mountain range.

The nature reserve was created by Resolution No. 74 of February 27, 2014 by the National Forest Corporation which also created the Pío XI Glacier natural site in the national park.

See also 
 Circo de los Altares
 Mount Fitz Roy
 Cerro Torre
 Southern Patagonian Ice Field
 Bernardo O'Higgins National Park, Chile
 Los Glaciares National Park, Argentina

References 

Protected areas of Magallanes Region
Protected areas established in 2014
2014 establishments in Chile